Calcutta was a wooden three-masted sailing ship launched in Quebec in 1874. She wrecked on the north side of Grindstone Island in the Magdalen Islands, Quebec, on 8 November 1875.

Calcutta first appeared in Lloyd's Register (LR) in 1874.

{| class=" wikitable"
|-
! Year
! Master
! Owner
! Home port
! Source
|-
| 1874
| W.Fullerton
| J.G.Ross
| Quebec
| 'LR|-
|}Calcutta left Quebec on 4 November 1875, bound for Liverpool. Four days later, in poor visibility, a strong current caused her to strike a rock. The crew and a lady passenger took to a boat, against the captain's orders. The boat overturned, drowning them. The captain and four crew members stayed with the ship and were later saved. Twenty-three people had lost their lives. Calcutta'', valued at $50,000, was a total loss, as was her cargo, valued at $20,000.

References

1874 ships
Ships built in Quebec
Maritime incidents in November 1875